Nasra Abdullah Reinsberg (born Nasra Badalla Abdullah; 13 July 1985) is a Kenyan-Norwegian football attacking midfielder currently playing in the Toppserien for Lillestrøm SK, with whom she has also played the Champions League. In addition she played one NCAA season for UAB Blazers.

On 31 January 2009 she made her debut with the Norwegian national team. In doing so, she became the first immigrant to feature for Norway.

Her brother Mohammed Abdullah has played for Ull/Kisa.

References

1985 births
Living people
Norwegian women's footballers
Kenyan emigrants to Norway
LSK Kvinner FK players
Toppserien players
Norwegian expatriate women's footballers
Expatriate women's soccer players in the United States
Norwegian expatriate sportspeople in the United States
Norway women's international footballers
UAB Blazers women's soccer players
Women's association football midfielders